In algebraic geometry, the tangent space to a functor generalizes the classical construction of a tangent space such as the Zariski tangent space. The construction is based on the following observation. Let X be a scheme over a field k.

(To see this, use the fact that any local homomorphism  must be of the form
)
Let F be a functor from the category of k-algebras to the category of sets.
If the functor F  preserves fibered products (e.g. if it is a scheme), the tangent space may be given the structure of a vector space over k.

The construction may be thought of as defining an analog of the tangent bundle in the following way. Let . Then, for any morphism  of schemes over k, one sees ; this shows that the map  that f induces is precisely the differential of f under the above identification.

References 

Algebraic geometry